The Christian Songs chart is a record chart compiled by Billboard magazine. Launched on June 21, 2003, the chart was ranked during the decade by overall audience impressions (the approximate number of audience impressions made for each play, as determined by BDS data cross-referenced with Arbitron listener information). While the chart covers all Christian radio formats, it is dominated by Christian adult contemporary (Christian AC) radio stations, which cater to a mostly adult audience. As opposed to Christian stations that cater to young audiences, Christian AC stations tend to play hits often and for long periods. As a result, number-one singles on the Christian Songs chart often had lengthy stays at the top position.

During the 2000s, 44 singles reached the number one position on the Christian Songs chart. MercyMe was the most successful group, with seven of their singles topping the chart during the 2000s. The band's "Word of God Speak" was the longest-running number one single of the 2000s, having spent a total of 23 non-consecutive weeks atop the chart. Casting Crowns spent the longest time atop the chart during the decade, as their six number one singles spent a combined total of 62 weeks at the summit. Out of the 44 singles that hit the number-one position during the 2000s, 15 singles spent two separate runs atop the chart. Three singles ("Word of God Speak", "My Savior My God", and "Cry Out to Jesus") returned to the top position for three distinct runs. Nineteen artists recorded number-one singles during the decade. The first number-one single of the 2000s on the chart was Third Day's "You Are So Good to Me", which led the chart's debut week of June 21, 2003, and seven consecutive weeks afterward; the final number-one single was TobyMac's "City On Our Knees", which led the chart for the final eleven weeks of the 2000s, and continued to lead into 2010.

Number-one singles

Statistics

By artist
Five artists achieved three or more number-one singles during the 2000s.

Six artists spent 25 or more weeks atop the chart in the 2000s.

Songs by total number of weeks at number one
Five songs spent at least ten weeks atop the chart in the 2000s.

See also
List of number-one Billboard Christian Songs of the 2010s

References

United States Christian Songs
2000s